Maori voting rights in Australia have an unusual history compared to voting rights for other non-white minorities. Male Māori Australians were first given the vote through the Commonwealth Franchise Act 1902, which specifically limited voting enrolment to persons of European descent, and aboriginal natives of New Zealand, in an effort to allay New Zealand's concerns about joining the Federation of Australia. During the parliamentary debates over the Act, leading Labor Party member King O'Malley supported the inclusion of Maori, and the exclusion of Aboriginal Australians, in the franchise, arguing that "An aboriginal is not as intelligent as a Maori."

This anomalous condition remained in some jurisdictions (such as the Northern Territory) until 1962, when the Commonwealth Electoral Act superseded the earlier act.

Prior to universal Australian Indigenous franchise, organisations such as the Australian Aborigines' League highlighted the inconsistencies in Australian law that allowed Maori voting rights (as well as old age and disability pensions, maternity bonuses and unemployment relief) but denied them to Aboriginals and Torres Strait Islanders.

See also
Voting rights of Aboriginal and Torres Strait Islander peoples
Suffrage in Australia

References

Sources
 
 

Political history of Australia
Māori politics
Australia–New Zealand relations
Māori history